Elizaveta Kulichkova was the defending champion, but chose not to participate.

Bernarda Pera won the title, defeating Kristýna Plíšková in the final, 7–5, 4–6, 6–3.

Seeds

Draw

Finals

Top half

Bottom half

References
Main Draw

ITS Cup - Singles
ITS Cup